Barber Lake is a lake in Alberta, Canada.

Barber Lake has the name of H. G. Barber.

See also
List of lakes of Alberta

References

Lakes of Alberta